Benjamin Joseph Scotti (born June 9, 1937) is a former American football defensive back in the National Football League.  A graduate of the University of Maryland (1959), Scotti played for the Washington Redskins (1959–1961), the Philadelphia Eagles (1962–1963), and the San Francisco 49ers (1964). In late November 1963, Scotti received brief national attention when he precipitated a fight with teammate John Mellekas that sent Mellekas to the hospital.  He is the brother of media mogul Tony Scotti, with whom he co-produced a few television programs, most notably the lifeguard drama Baywatch, and also co-founded the Scotti Bros. record label which released music by artists such as Leif Garrett, Survivor and "Weird Al" Yankovic until the label was dissolved in the mid-1990s. He went on to form Banders.

External links
 

1937 births
Living people
Players of American football from Newark, New Jersey
American football defensive backs
Maryland Terrapins football players
Washington Redskins players
Philadelphia Eagles players
San Francisco 49ers players